La Rabona is a 1979 Argentine comedy film directed by Mario David. It stars Alberto Closas, Claudia Cárpena, and Perla Santalla. The screenplay was written by the director Mario David, working in collaboration with Isaac Aisemberg. Atilio Stampone composed the soundtrack.

Plot
A man and his daughter, tired of family feuding and their routines, miss school and work the same day.

Cast

Production
La Rabona was produced by Horacio Parisotto and Mario Fasola under the Fotograma SRL Producciones Cinematográficas production company. The screenplay was written by the director Mario David, working in collaboration with Isaac Aisemberg. Cinematographer José Santiso was hired to shoot the film. Atilio Stampone composed the soundtrack.

Reception
Néstor, writing in Esquiú wrote: "Well-intentioned and with a certain moralizing tendency... the liberality of modernist customs contrasts with the modesty and purity of the traditional family habits".
Rafael Granados opined: "Mario David constructs a sensitive film, whose images are spoken softly". In their 2001 book  Un diccionario de films argentinos (1930-1995), Raúl Manrupe and María Alejandra Portela describe the film as a "discreet effort to get away from an industry in crisis, in a difficult time not only for the cinema".

See also
List of Argentine films of 1979

References

External links
 

1979 films
1970s Spanish-language films
Argentine comedy films
1979 comedy films
Films directed by Mario David